Torgersen is a surname. Notable people with the surname include:

Alek Torgersen (born 1995), American football player
Brad R. Torgersen (born 1974), multi-award-winning American sci-fi author and military veteran
Einar Torgersen (1886–1946), Norwegian sailor who competed in the 1920 Summer Olympics
Fredrik Fasting Torgersen (born 1934), Norwegian convicted of murder
Hans Torgersen (born 1926), Norwegian politician for the Christian Democratic Party
John Torgersen (1878–1958), Norwegian businessperson and politician
Jon Fredrik "Joffe" Torgersen, singer in Delaware (band), a Norwegian indie/alternative rock band
Otto Torgersen (1910–2000), Norwegian architect, born in Trondheim
Paul Torgersen (born 1931), President of Virginia Polytechnic Institute and State University
Rolf Normann Torgersen (1918–2010), Norwegian jurist and civil servant
Sjur Torgersen (1946–2005), Norwegian Ambassador and diplomat
Tore Torgersen (born 1968), Norwegian ten-pin bowler
Thor C. Torgersen (born 1962), Co-Founder Veterans Equine Therapeutic Services

See also
Torgersen Island, small island in the Palmer Archipelago of Antarctica
Thoresen
Torgsin
Torsen